Alton C. Crews Middle School is part of the Brookwood Cluster of Gwinnett County, Georgia, United States, and is part of Gwinnett County Public Schools. Ms. Cindy Moffett is the new school principal.

Founded in 1996, the school is named after Dr. Alton C. Crews (1924–1996), a 13-year former superintendent of Gwinnett County Public Schools (1977–1989) and the first Georgian to break the sound barrier.

With student population rising every year, the addition of classroom trailers has been constant. An addition to the school was completed in 2007-2008. There is a total of 14 classrooms - ten regular education classrooms and four for resource. New renovations, including a new computer lab, were added as of August 2007. As of 2008, the school had more than 1,400 students.

In 2002 or 2003, after a tour of the technology laboratory at the school, the education minister for Curaçao invited teacher Janet Blanchette to visit that country and help train their teachers, since the school system there was in the middle of a technology upgrade.

History 
The school was opened in 1997, under principal Mary Anne Charron. Crews is one of the two middle schools in the Brookwood cluster, along with Five Forks Middle School. Brookwood Elementary School and Craig Elementary School feed into Crews. Crews feeds into Brookwood High School, which continues to deliver adequate educational services to students, and is considered one of the best schools in the state by the principal.

Layout 
Crews Middle School consists of one hallway that has multiple different hallways branching from it. There are four "communities" at Crews. Community A consists of the 7th-grade classrooms and the science labs. It is next to the front lobby and front office. Community B, which consists of the computer labs and the 8th-grade classrooms, is close to Community A, but more towards the center of the school. Students generally enter and exit in the school through Community B to get to the bus lane. The Media Center is located at the center of the school. Community C is the newest addition to the school, built for 6th graders. Before this, the 6th graders had to use the trailers in the bus lanes to go to their classes. Community C is located towards the back of the school. Community D has the cafeteria, connections classes, and the gym, as well the doors to the car rider lane, which is centered around the back parking lot. Community D is at the very back of the school. Each community has two hallways, and A, B, and C have grade-level offices which have the grade level assistant principal, the counselors, and flyers relating to the grade level events, like socials.

Awards and recognition

Most recent recognition
In the 2005-2006 school year, Crews "outperformed every middle school in the Gwinnett County Public Schools system in 14 of the 15 areas measured in the state's Criterion-Referenced Competency Tests," and was the only school in the district to achieve a 100 percent passing rate. On the math subtest, the school achieved a 99 percent passing rate, according to the Accountability Report published by the school system.

According to the school district, Crews' good test scores are "directly related to the culture of collaboration and professional learning among Crews Middle teachers." The 2006-2007 Accountability Report described the collaboration:

"Teachers met weekly to examine common assessments, review instructional strengths and students' needs, and discuss and implement research-based instructional strategies. Professional learning emphasized the application of researched-based instructional strategies. These weekly meetings have proven beneficial."

Intel Schools of Distinction Award

In August 2006, the school won one of 16 Intel and Scholastic Schools of Distinction Awards recognized across the United States. The annual awards program honors schools for "implementing innovative and replicable programs that support positive educational outcomes and impact student achievement." Crews won its award for professional development. According to the award's website, "Through leadership training, peer coaching, and mentoring opportunities, Alton C. Crews Middle School in Lawrenceville, GA, makes professional development a top priority. Everyone participates in the voluntary program, and creates a culture of collaboration."

In 2010, Deborah Stringfellow was named Teacher of the Year for Gwinnett County Public Schools and was one of the top finalists for the state of Georgia.

Along with $10,000 in award money, the school received $250,000 in "instructional prizes." The school used the money to buy SmartBoards, which are like a traditional chalkboard, but which interact with computers, giving teachers the ability to save what is written on the board or project images from a computer file; and Student Response Systems, which allow students to enter their answers to questions into a handheld controller that sends the answer to a computer. With this system, students punch in their answers to quizzes, allowing their teacher to see instantly how well they understand a concept. Intel gave the school three SmartBoards, and the school bought ten more with the award money.

Georgia "Pay for Performance" award

In January 2004, the school was one of 68 across the state which received award grants from the Georgia Department of Education in return for meeting achievement goals and effectively collaborating as a faculty. The school was awarded $130,456 for performance in the 2002-2003 school year.

Academic programs
Math and English cover a variety of topics each year, in preparation for the Georgia Milestones Test at the end of the year. Crews students earn higher scores on the test than other schools across the state. Each year, the scientists studied is just one branch. 6th-grade students study earth science (rocks, meteorology, oceanography, and astronomy); 7th-grade students study life science (mostly biology, some ecology); and 8th-grade students study high school physical science (physics and chemistry), and have the option to earn high school credit for the class. Social studies is done in a similar fashion.

In 2005, the school began offering Latin language classes, and out of 445 eighth grade students, 104 elected to take the course. Latin is no longer offered at the school.

At Crews, "Connections" classes (sometimes called "specials" in other schools) are extra classes which still make up part of a student's academic grade. Three Connections classes are electives, and these are all musical in nature: Band, Orchestra, and Chorus. As of the 2015-16 school year, the students have little say in which Connections classes they take. Other Connections include Computer Science, Art, Technology Education, Peer Leading (8th grade only), and Media Center Assistants (7th and 8th grades only).

"Probe" or "gifted" classes are advanced courses in certain subjects: English, math, social studies, and science.

In "inclusion classes," for one period a day, a special education teacher and the regular education teacher "team teach" the same class, in order for special education students (as well as regular students) to get more attention. Inclusion classes are taught in social studies, math, language arts, and mainly science (since special education teachers, who can teach the other three primary subjects on their own, cannot teach science in each grade level). There are no inclusion Connections classes.

Music programs

Chorus
Chorus began at Crews in 1997, but due to budget cuts, it was lifted from the Connections program. In 2005, a new chorus teacher at Crews brought the program back. They have been very successful, such as the 6th grade chorus performing in combination with the 6th grade band and orchestra, and presenting the 10th anniversary concert on May 1, 2007, for Crews' 10th Anniversary Dedication. They have won numerous awards from GMEA for superior ratings.  Several chorus students have represented the school in their District Honor Chorus and GMEA All-State Chorus.  Many of the students go on to sing with the Brookwood High School Choruses. Many singers also participate in community choirs such as the Gwinnett Young Singers and Gwinnett Young Men's Ensemble, and various church choirs.  Sabrina Robertson is the choral director.

Band
The band has been in existence since 1997. Frank Folds was the band director from the school's opening in 1997 through 2015. In 2015, Frank Folds retired and was succeeded by Colin Caldarera, who taught one year before leaving the school in 2016. The current directors are Amanda Bingham and Darvin McRoy. Many students continue taking band after the 6th-grade connections orientation. Many band students go on to play in the Brookwood High School Bronco Marching Band and Concert Bands. They have had many students make the Georgia All-State Band.

Frank Folds was the 2008-2009 Teacher of the Year at Crews. He led the Crews Middle School band students to LGPE (Large Group Performance Evaluation) for many years with superior ratings. Folds is regarded as one of the best band directors in the state, previously having been president of the Georgia Music Educators Association.

Instruments in the band include brass, woodwinds, low winds, and percussion.

Orchestra
The Orchestra has won numerous awards, performing at UGA, GMEA festivals, and the Governor's Mansion. Many of the students go on to play with the award-winning Brookwood High School Orchestras, and Honors Orchestra (band and strings students combined). They have had many students make the Georgia Allstate and Statewide Honor Orchestras. Kinsey Edwards and Suzanne Pearson are the directors of the orchestra program.

Reader's Rally
Crews has an excellent Reader's Rally team that placed first in Gwinnett County in 2012. They also placed second in the county in 2014 and 2015.

Musical theatre
A musical is put on every year at Crews, usually in the spring.

 2004 - The Music Man, Jr.
 2005 - Once On This Island, Jr.
 2006 - Schoolhouse Rock Live! Jr.
 2007 - Broncos on Broadway: 100 Years of Broadway
 2008 - One Hundred and One Dalmatians, Jr.
 2009 - Alice in Wonderland, Jr.
 2010 - Annie, Jr.
 2011 - Seussical Jr.
 2012 - Willy Wonka Jr.
 2013 - Hair

Crews News club
Since 2005, Crews Middle School's announcements are made on air. Students are the anchors and reporters on this show; this lets them see what it feels like to be in the spotlight. It broadcasts on Mondays, Wednesdays, and Fridays. Since 2015, the Pledge of Allegiance is recited at the beginning  of the news show followed by a moment of silence.

References

External links

 Official site
 Information on the school from the Georgia Department of Education
 State "Report Card" for the school, 2005-2006 school year

Educational institutions established in 1996
Schools in Gwinnett County, Georgia
Public middle schools in Georgia (U.S. state)
1996 establishments in Georgia (U.S. state)